Lanthanum barium copper oxide, or LBCO, is an inorganic compound with the formula CuBa0.15La1.85O4.  It is a black solid produced by heating an intimate mixture of barium oxide, copper(II) oxide, and lanthanum oxide in the presence of oxygen. The material was discovered in 1986 and was the first high temperature superconductor. Johannes Georg Bednorz and K. Alex Müller shared the 1987 Nobel Prize in physics for the discovery that this material exhibits superconductivity at the then unusually high temperature.  This finding led to intense and fruitful efforts to generate other cuprate superconductors.

Lanthanum barium copper oxide is related to the far simpler compound lanthanum cuprate, which has a similar structure.  In lanthanum barium copper oxide, some of the La(III) centers are replaced by Ba(II), which has a similar ionic radius.  This Ba-for-La replacement causes removal of some electrons from the d-band associated with the sheets of copper oxide.

References

High-temperature superconductors
Lanthanum compounds
Barium compounds
Copper compounds
Oxides